Kirsten Melkevik Otterbu ( May 29 May 1970) is a Norwegian long-distance runner who specializes in the marathon.

Biography
In the marathon event she finished 28th at the 2005 World Championships, 13th at the 2006 European Championships, 29th at the 2007 World Championships and 34th at the 2008 Olympic Games. She won the Stockholm Marathon in 2007.

She became Norwegian champion in the 5000 metres in 2006, in the 10,000 metres in 2006 and 2007 and in the half marathon in 2006. She was born in Øystese, and represents the sports club IL Gular.

Melkevik received attention when she changed her legal name from Kirsten Melkevik Otterbu to Kirsten Marathon Melkevik in September 2010.

Personal bests
3000 metres - 8:58.74 min (2008) 
5000 metres - 16:00.51 min (2006) 
10,000 metres - 32:31.45 min (2008) 
Half marathon - 1:10:19 hrs (2006) - fourth among Norwegian half marathon runners, only behind Ingrid Kristiansen, Grete Waitz and Stine Larsen.
Marathon - 2:29:12 hrs (2007) - fourth among Norwegian marathon runners, only behind Ingrid Kristiansen, Grete Waitz and Stine Larsen.

Achievements

References

External links
 

1970 births
Living people
Norwegian female long-distance runners
Norwegian female marathon runners
Athletes (track and field) at the 2008 Summer Olympics
Olympic athletes of Norway
People from Kvam
Sportspeople from Vestland